
Kombo was a territory and kingdom in Gambia during the colonial period.

Kombo may also refer to:

Places
Kombo Central, a district of Gambia's Western Division
Kombo East, a district of Gambia's Western Division
Kombo South, a district of Gambia's Western Division
Kombo North/Saint Mary, a district of Gambia's Western Division
Kombo Kombo, a settlement in Kenya's Coast Province
Kombo-Abedimo, a commune and arrondissement in the Ndian département, Southwest Province, western Cameroon.
Kombo-Idinti, a commune and arrondissement in the Ndian département, Southwest Province, western Cameroon

People with the surname
Ernest Kombo, Congolese Roman Catholic Bishop
Musikari Kombo, Kenyan politician

Other
Pycnanthus angolensis, a tree species or its product, kombo butter

See also
Combo (disambiguation)
Kombi (disambiguation)